Adama Coulibaly (born 25 January 1998) is a Malian basketball player for Saint-Louis Basket and the Malian national team.

She represented Mali at the 2019 Women's Afrobasket.

References

External links

1998 births
Living people
Expatriate basketball people in Belgium
Power forwards (basketball)
Malian expatriate sportspeople in Belgium
Malian women's basketball players
Sportspeople from Bamako
21st-century Malian people